Vladimir Krstić may refer to:

 Vladimir Krstić (basketball) (born 1972), Croatian basketball coach and player
 Vladimir Krstić (comics) (born 1959), Serbian comic-book and graphic novel creator, painter and illustrator
 Vladimir Krstić (rower) (born 1959), Yugoslav rower
 Vladimir Krstić (footballer) (born 1987), Serbian footballer